Watchung Avenue (known as Park Street until April 1, 1919) is a New Jersey Transit station at the intersection of Watchung Avenue, Watchung Plaza, and Park Street in Montclair, New Jersey along the Montclair-Boonton Line. The Watchung Avenue station is on an elevated embankment between Watchung Plaza and Park  Street. The outbound platform faces the plaza, while the inbound platform and the station house are on the Park Street side. The station house has a waiting room with a bathroom and a former post office and ticket booth. Service to and from this station is weekdays (Monday to Friday) only, with all service stopping at intermediate points.

Station layout
The station's low-level side platforms are not wheelchair accessible.

References

Bibliography

External links

NJ Transit Rail Operations stations
Railway stations in the United States opened in 1873
Railway stations in Essex County, New Jersey
Montclair, New Jersey
Railway stations on the National Register of Historic Places in New Jersey
Former Erie Railroad stations